DBU Funen is the local governing body for association football and futsal on Funen and the surrounding isles, Denmark. They are responsible for the governance and development of men's and women's football at all levels in the region. DBU Funen is a member of the Union of Local Football Associations in Denmark (FLU) under the Danish Football Association (DBU) and National Olympic Committee and Sports Confederation of Denmark (DIF). The headquarters is located in the western part of Odense. Clubs situated on Funen and surrounding areas, covering the postal codes between 5000 and 5999 can be accepted as members of DBU Funen. In 2017 the football association consisted of 158 clubs and 28,993 members with Dalum IF being the largest club membership-wise. Founded on 10 July 1904, it is the fourth oldest regional football association under the Danish FA and kept its original name, Fyns Boldspil-Union (FBU), until 1 February 2011, where it was changed to its current name, DBU Fyn.

History 
Former og current logos:

Competitions

As of 2016, the football association administers the local men's senior leagues at level 5 in the Danish football league system besides women's and youth football. The top league at the local senior men's level under the football association's administration is called Fynsserien and was regarded as one among several top regional leagues in Danish football between 1904 and 1927. Before the national "knockout" cup competition, DBU Pokalen, was introduced in 1954, the football association had its own regional cup competitions known as FBUs Pokalturnering, which was contested between 1920 and 1953. Clubs playing at the lower leagues participate in the qualification rounds for the first round proper of DBU Pokalen.

Senior Men's 
 Leagues
 Fynsserien
 Serie 1
 Serie 2
 Serie 3
 Serie 4
 Serie 5
 Cups
 Qualification for DBU Pokalen
 Herresenior Pokalturnering (Albani Pokalen for Herrer) for clubs playing in Series 3 to Series 5

Senior Women's 
 Leagues
 Kvinde-Fynsserien
 Kvinde Serie 1
 Kvinde Serie 2
 Cups
 Qualification for DBU Kvindepokalen
 Damesenior Pokalturnering (Albani Pokalen for Kvinder) for clubs playing in Kvinde-Fynsserien to Series 2

Defunct 
 FBUs Pokalturnering (1920–1953) for the FBU member clubs

List of chairmen 
A total of 8 different persons have been chairman for DBU Funen.

 1904–1908: Max Smith, Odense BK
 1908–1944: Niels Jensen, Odense BK
 1944–1964: Egon Larsen, Odense KFUM
 1964–1983: Carl Anton Kofoed, Odense BK
 1983–1997: Ernst Christensen, Nyborg G&IF
 1997–2002: Allan Hansen, Middelfart G&BK
 2002–2013: Thomas Bytoft, Thurø BK
 2013–present: Bjarne Christensen, Dalum IF

References

External links 
 

Funen
Organizations based in Odense
Sports organizations established in 1904